Enrique Molina (31 October 1943 – 3 September 2021) was a Cuban film and television actor.

Molina died from COVID-19 in 2021, during the COVID-19 pandemic in Cuba.

Career
Molina was born in Santiago de Cuba. In 1968, he joined the Conjunto Dramático de Oriente theatrical company. In 1968, he began to work in television, appearing on Tele-Rebelde until 1970 when he moved to Havana. He had performed theatre, appeared on Cuban radio and television programmes, and in films. He was often described as a character actor.

Partial filmography

 El hombre de Maisinicú (1973)
 Polvo Rojo (1981)
 La segunda hora de Esteban Zayas (1984)
 Jíbaro (1984)
 Una novia para David (1985) - Taxi driver
 En tres y dos (1985)
 Hello, Hemingway (1990) - Manolo
 Alicia en el pueblo de Maravillas (1991)
 Caravana (1992)
 Derecho de Asilo (1993)
 Kleines Tropicana (1997)
 Un paraíso bajo las estrellas (1999) - Candido
 Hacerse el sueco (2001) - Amancio
 ¿Quién eres tú? (2001, Short) - Hombre
 Video de Familia (2001)
 Concurso (2002, Short) - Da Rosa
 ¿La vida en rosa? (2004)
 La Revelación (2004, Short)
 90 millas (2005) - Rolando
 Barrio Cuba (2005)
 El Último vagón (2006, Short) - Jefe de estación
 El Benny (2006) - Olimpio
 Páginas del diario de Mauricio (2005)
 Mañana (2007)
 El Cuerno de la abundancia (2008) - Bernardo
 Lisanka (2009) - Máximo
 Acorazado (2010) - Alberto
 Club Habana (2010) - Manolo
 Amor crónico (2010)
 Day of the Flowers (2012) - Jorge
 Esther en alguna parte (2013) - Larry Po
 Contigo pan y cebolla (2014) - Anselmo
 The Human Thing (2016)
 Four Seasons in Havana (2016) - Antonio Rangel
 Los buenos demonios (2018) - Molina

See also
 Cinema of Cuba
 Media of Cuba

References

External links
 
  ICAIC's (Cuban Film Industry) Official Website
 

1943 births
2021 deaths
People from Santiago de Cuba
20th-century Cuban male actors
21st-century Cuban male actors
Cuban male film actors
Cuban radio actors
Cuban male television actors
Cuban male stage actors
Deaths from the COVID-19 pandemic in Cuba